
Gmina Sośnie is a rural gmina (administrative district) in Ostrów Wielkopolski County, Greater Poland Voivodeship, in west-central Poland.

The gmina contains part of the protected area called Barycz Valley Landscape Park.

Villages
Gmina Sośnie contains the villages and settlements of Bogdaj, Bronisławka, Chojnik, Cieszyn, Czesławice, Dobrzec, Grabie, Granowiec, Janisławice, Jarnostaw, Kałkowskie, Kąty Śląskie, Kocina, Konradów, Kopalina, Krzyżno, Kuźnica Kącka, Łachów, Lipskie, Mariak, Młynik, Moja Wola, Możdżanów, Pawłów, Piła, Smugi, Sobki, Sośnie, Starża, Surmin, Szklarka Śląska and Żabnik.

Neighbouring gminas
Gmina Sośnie is bordered by the gminas of Kobyla Góra, Krośnice, Międzybórz, Milicz, Odolanów, Ostrzeszów, Przygodzice and Twardogóra.

References
Polish official population figures 2006

Sosnie
Ostrów Wielkopolski County